In Siberia Tonight is an Australian comedy talk show which aired on SBS from 2005 to 2006. The program was hosted by comedian Steve Abbott and was themed around his Russian heritage. The program commonly featured The Kransky Sisters, Indira Naidoo, Steves' mum Evelyn Abbott and Marcello Maio.

References 
Sydney Morning Herald - Show debut report

2005 Australian television series debuts
2006 Australian television series endings
Special Broadcasting Service original programming
Australian television talk shows